Tribulus planospira is a species of sea snail, a marine gastropod mollusk in the family Muricidae, the murex snails or rock snails. , it is the only species in the genus Tribulus included in the World Register of Marine Species. Tribulus has previously been considered a subgenus of the genera Murex, Purpura, and Thais.

References

Rapaninae
Gastropods described in 1822